Arnt Kortgaard (born 13 October 1957) is a Norwegian footballer. He played in four matches for the Norway national football team from 1983 to 1987.

References

External links
 

1957 births
Living people
Norwegian footballers
Norway international footballers
Place of birth missing (living people)
Association footballers not categorized by position